Gertrude Fröhlich-Sandner (born Gertrude Kastner; 25 April 1926 – died 13 June 2008) was an Austrian politician for the SPÖ (Social Democratic Party of Austria).

She was born and died in Vienna. In 1993 she became an honorary citizen of Vienna.

External links 
 Fröhlich-Sandner's entry at aeiou

1926 births
2008 deaths
20th-century Austrian people
Austrian women in politics
Politicians from Vienna
Knights Commander of the Order of Merit of the Federal Republic of Germany